Liberty Township, Nebraska may refer to the following places:

Liberty Township, Fillmore County, Nebraska
Liberty Township, Gage County, Nebraska
Liberty Township, Kearney County, Nebraska
Liberty Township, Valley County, Nebraska

See also 
Liberty Township (disambiguation)

Nebraska township disambiguation pages